Equinox Publishing Ltd is an independent academic publisher founded in 2003 by Janet Joyce and based in Sheffield. It publishes textbooks, anthologies, monographs, and reference books in the areas of archaeology, linguistics, cultural history, religious studies, theology, biblical studies, cookery, and popular music. In 2009, Equinox had a list of over 200 published titles and planned to publish another 40 new books. The list of academic journals has grown to over 40 titles in 2015.

References

External links

Publishing companies of the United Kingdom
Publishing companies established in 2003
Privately held companies of the United Kingdom